China Basin can refer to:
China Basin, San Francisco, a neighborhood in San Francisco
China Basin Bridge, another name for the Lefty O'Doul Bridge, a drawbridge which connects the China Basin and Mission Bay neighborhoods of San Francisco
China Basin fire, a five-alarm fire that occurred on March 11, 2014, in the Mission Bay neighborhood of San Francisco
China Basin Landing, an office complex in the Mission Bay area of San Francisco, California
China Basin Stakes, ungraded stakes race for three-year-olds and up, run at Golden Gate Fields
:Category:Drainage basins of China
Juyan Lake Basin
Nanyang Basin
Qaidam Basin
Sichuan Basin
Tarim Basin